Cedar Pond is a small oval-shaped pond in the town of Lakeville, Massachusetts. It is located just off of Somserset Lane from Long Point Road, which is easily accessible from Route 105.  The pond is primarily used for irrigating nearby bogs and farmland.

References 

Ponds of Plymouth County, Massachusetts
Lakeville, Massachusetts
Ponds of Massachusetts